FC Astrakhan was a Russian football club from Astrakhan, founded in 1931. It played in the Russian Professional Football League. Their first season on the professional level was in 2000. The team was called FC Sudostroitel Astrakhan until 2007. The club was dissolved in July 2016.

References

External links
Fanclub Caspian pirates
Club page at 2liga.ru

Association football clubs established in 1931
Association football clubs disestablished in 2016
Defunct football clubs in Russia
Sport in Astrakhan
1931 establishments in Russia
2016 disestablishments in Russia